Somatane is an Indian village and gram panchayat located in Mawal taluka of Pune district, Maharashtra.

Administration
The village is administrated by a sarpanch, an elected representative who leads a gram panchayat. At the time of the 2011 Census of India, the village was a self-contained gram panchayat, meaning that there were no other constituent villages governed by the body.

Demographics
At the 2011 census, the village comprised 1159 households. The population of 5300 was split between 2715 males and 2585 females.

See also 
List of villages in Mawal taluka

References 

Villages in Mawal taluka
Gram Panchayats in Pune district